"Cäcilie", Op. 27 No. 2, is the second in a set of four songs composed by Richard Strauss in 1894.

The words are from a love poem "Cäcilie" written by Heinrich Hart (1855–1906), a German dramatic critic and journalist who also wrote poetry. It was written for the poet's wife Cäcilie.

, or UK English as "Cecilia".

History 

Strauss composed the song at Marquartstein on 9 September 1894.
, the day before his wedding to the soprano Pauline de Ahna.  All four of the Opus 27 songs, including Cäcilie were given as a wedding present to her.

Instrumentation and accompaniment
The song was originally written with piano accompaniment in the key of E major, but later orchestrated in his 'heroic' key of E.  The instrumentation is: 2 flutes, 2 oboes, 2 clarinets in B, 2 bassoons, 4 horns in E, 2 trumpets in E, 3 trombones, tuba, 3 timpani, harp and the orchestral string section.

The tempo direction is "Sehr lebhaft und drängend".

Strauss, in his rich and lively orchestration, included parts for a solo string player from each section.

The change of key a semitone down from E to E explains why, from bar 34 on the violas are asked to play the note B, a semitone below the lowest note normally possible on the instrument; and at this point Strauss asks half the violas to tune this string down a semitone. For the same reason the full score, bar 39, gives the second flute the note B, a semitone lower than its normal lowest note.

Lyrics

Opus 27 
The other songs of Strauss' Opus 27:
 Op. 27 No. 1 "Ruhe, meine Seele!" (Nicht ein Lüftchen regt sich leise) 
 Op. 27 No. 3 "Heimliche Aufforderung" (Auf, hebe die funkelnde Schale)
 Op. 27 No. 4 "Morgen!" (Und morgen wird die Sonne wieder scheinen)

Recordings 

There are many recordings of this, one of Strauss's most popular songs. Richard Strauss recorded it in once in 1944, accompanying the Austrian soprano Maria Reining on the piano.

References and notes

External links 

Songs by Richard Strauss
1894 songs